In the United States, a speaking indictment is an indictment that goes beyond the mere statement of charges, thus putting statements about alleged events into the public domain. In 2018, it was reported that speaking indictments had been used as part of the Mueller Inquiry into Russian interference with the American political process.

References 

United States criminal law